Sifiso Musawenkosi Sonjica is a South African politician who has represented the African National Congress (ANC) in the KwaZulu-Natal Provincial Legislature since 2016. He was formerly a businessman and a leader of the ANC Youth League in KwaZulu-Natal.

Political career 
Sonjica was formerly active in the ANC Youth League and served as the Provincial Chairperson of the league's KwaZulu-Natal branch in the early 2000s. In 2012, he contested unsuccessfully for election as Regional Chairperson of the ANC's eThekwini branch, running against Sibongiseni Dhlomo and Nhlakanipho Ntombela; Sonjica withdrew from the race, which was ultimately won by Dhlomo. 

In the 2014 general election, Sonjica stood as a candidate for election to the KwaZulu-Natal Provincial Legislature but was ranked 57th on the ANC's provincial party list and did not immediately secure election to a seat. He worked as a businessman until 30 June 2016, when he was sworn in to the legislature to fill a casual vacancy. He and Nomakiki Majola replaced Mike Mabuyakhulu and Peggy Nkonyeni, who had resigned from their legislative seats after being sacked from the KwaZulu-Natal Executive Council. He was elected to his first full term in the legislature in the 2019 general election, ranked 42nd on the ANC's party list.

References

External links 
 
 Hon. SM Sonjica at KwaZulu-Natal Provincial Legislature

Living people
Year of birth missing (living people)
African National Congress politicians
21st-century South African politicians
Members of the KwaZulu-Natal Legislature